Beyssenac is a commune in the Corrèze department in central France.

Population

Sights
It is home to a Romanesque church (12th century) and a monument commemorating a massacre made by Nazi troops against the population of 16 February 1944.

See also
Communes of the Corrèze department

References

Communes of Corrèze